The IGAD Center of Excellence for Preventing and Countering Violent Extremism (ICEPCVE) is a regional platform for training, coordination and connectivity, knowledge sharing, community & civil society organization engagement, strategic communication and research on preventing/countering violent extremism for government and civil society actors in the Eastern and Horn of Africa region.

Formation 
ICEPCVE was established in 2016 and officially inaugurated in May 2018.

Mandate 
ICEPCVE's mandate as a regional coordinating body on P/CVE includes expediting partnerships between governments, non-governmental organizations and sub-national actors as well as capturing numerous locally led efforts to build community resilience against violent extremism in the Horn of Africa and the East African region.

Achievements

References 

Counter extremism